Jowzuiyeh (also Romanized as Jowzū’īyeh; also known as Jowzū) is a village in Sarduiyeh Rural District, Sarduiyeh District, Jiroft County, Kerman Province, Iran. At the 2006 census, its population was 188, in 30 families.

References 

Populated places in Jiroft County